John Michael Vernon (27 July 1922 – November 1994) was an English first-class cricketer and Royal Navy sailor.

Vernon was born at Port Said in Egypt. He was educated in England at Tonbridge School. During the Second World War he played minor matches for Sussex. While later serving in the Royal Navy, Vernon made his debut in first-class cricket for the Combined Services cricket team against Warwickshire at Edgaston in 1949. He played first-class cricket for the Combined Services until 1952, making eight appearances. He scored a total of 290 runs across his eight matches, with a batting average of 22.30 and a high score of 83.

Vernon died at Portsmouth in November 1994.

References

External links

1922 births
1994 deaths
People from Port Said
People educated at Tonbridge School
20th-century Royal Navy personnel
English cricketers
Combined Services cricketers
British expatriates in Egypt